Cidaridae is a family of sea urchins in the order Cidaroida.

Description and characteristics 

Cidarid sea urchins are characterized by their stout skeleton : the test is thick and hard, with massive perforated tubercles (never crenulated) surrounded by a crown of secondary tubercles, but no primary tubercles in the interambulacra regions. These tubercles hold massive spines, thick, strong and often very long, and showing sometimes odd shapes (thorny spines, fans, clubs, Christmas trees...).

The order Cidaroida is the basalmost of current sea urchins, and most of the species included in this family are abyssal, even if a handful of species remain quite common in tropical shallow waters, like Eucidaris or Phyllacanthus.

Genera

According to the World Register of Marine Species (WoRMS), the following genera are included in this family 
 Subfamily Cidarinae (Mortensen, 1928a)
 Genus Calocidaris (H.L. Clark, 1907)
 Genus Centrocidaris (A. Agassiz, 1904)
 Genus Chondrocidaris (A. Agassiz, 1863)
 Genus Chorocidaris (Ikeda, 1941)
 Genus Cidaris (Leske, 1778)
 Genus Compsocidaris (Ikeda, 1939)
 Genus Eucidaris (Pomel, 1883)
 Genus Hesperocidaris (Mortensen, 1928b)
 Genus Kionocidaris (Mortensen, 1932)
 Genus Lissocidaris (Mortensen, 1939)
 Genus Tretocidaris (Mortensen, 1903b)
 Subfamily Goniocidarinae (Mortensen, 1928a)
 Genus Austrocidaris (H.L. Clark, 1907)
 Genus Goniocidaris (Desor, in Agassiz & Desor, 1846)
 Genus Ogmocidaris (Mortensen, 1921)
 Genus Psilocidaris (Mortensen, 1927)
 Genus Rhopalocidaris (Mortensen, 1927)
 Genus Schizocidaris (Mortensen, 1903b)
 Genus Adelcidaris (Cotton & Godfrey, 1942) (nomen dubium)
 Tribe Phyllacanthina (Smith & Wright, 1989)
 Genus Phyllacanthus (Brandt, 1835)
 Sub-family Stereocidarinae (Lambert, 1900)
 Genus Phalacrocidaris (Lambert, 1902)
 Genus Stereocidaris (Pomel, 1883)
 Subfamily Stylocidarinae (Mortensen, 1903)
 Genus Acanthocidaris (Mortensen, 1903b)
 Genus Plococidaris (Mortensen, 1909)
 Genus Prionocidaris (A. Agassiz, 1863)
 Genus Stylocidaris (Mortensen, 1909)

A now abandoned genus, Cidarites was used in the late 18th and early 19th century to describe a number of species of both cidarid and echid sea urchins.

References

 The Echinoid Directory : Taxonomy; Natural History Museum, London 
 Description of the Cidaridae; Natural History Museum, London 
 Hansson, H.G. (2001). Echinodermata, in: Costello, M.J. et al. (Ed.) (2001). European register of marine species: a check-list of the marine species in Europe and a bibliography of guides to their identification. Collection Patrimoines Naturels, 50: pp. 336–351

 
Cisuralian first appearances
Extant Permian first appearances
Echinoderm families